Arthur Hill High School is a public high school in Saginaw, Michigan, United States. It serves students in grades 9-12 as one of three high schools in the Saginaw Public School District.

History

The school was named after a successful lumbering and shipping owner, Arthur Hill. He was president of the school board for five years as well as the mayor of Saginaw three times. AHHS has been serving the Saginaw school district for over 118 years as of 2022.

Academics

Arthur Hill High School has been accredited by the North Central Association of Colleges and Schools (NCA) since 1904.

Demographics
The demographic breakdown of the 700 students enrolled for 2017-18 was:
Male - 50.9%
Female - 49.1%
Asian - 0.4%
Black - 64.7%
Hispanic - 20.0%
Native Hawaiian/Pacific islanders - 0.1%
White - 14.7%
Multiracial - 0.1%

78.0% of the students were eligible for free or reduced-cost lunch. For 2017–18, Hill was a Title I school.

Athletics
The Arthur Hill Lumberjacks compete in the Saginaw Valley League. Navy blue and gold are the school colors. The following Michigan High School Athletic Association (MHSAA) sanctioned sports are offered:

Baseball (boys) 
Basketball (girls and boys) 
Boys state champion - 1944, 2006
Bowling (girls and boys) 
Competitive cheerleading (girls) 
Cross country (girls and boys) 
Football (boys) 
State champion - 1991
Golf (boys) 
Boys state champion - 1966
Soccer (girls and boys) 
Softball (girls) 
Tennis (girls and boys) 
Track and field (girls and boys) 
Boys state champion - 1944
Volleyball (girls) 
Wrestling (boys) 

Although swimming and diving is no longer offered by the school, the Lumberjacks were boys state champion in 1945 and 1946.
Arthur Hill's 1973 varsity football team went undefeated (9-0), unscored upon (444-0), was unanimously voted No. 1 in all statewide media polls, and is still considered one of the greatest teams in Michigan history.

Notable alumni
Jason Richardson (Class of 1999) - National Basketball Association (NBA) Shooting Guard
Ed Albosta — Major League Baseball (MLB) pitcher
Alfonso Boone — National Football League (NFL) defensive end
Craig Dill – American Basketball Association (ABA) center
Adam Emmenecker — college basketball point guard
William H. Haithco Sr. — businessman and community leader
Harry Hawkins — All-American football player for the University of Michigan, 1923–1925
Stephen Lynch (Class of 1989) — professional comedian, Broadway star, Tony Award nominee
Jack O'Brien (Class of 1957) — Broadway director
Shonte Peoples (Class of 1989) — football player Michigan Wolverines
Dick Rifenburg (Class of 1944) — football player Michigan Wolverines, Detroit Lions. He led the Big Ten Conference in single season receptions during his senior year and set Michigan Wolverines receptions records for both career touchdown and single-season touchdowns.
Theodore Roethke — Poet, 1954 Pulitzer Prize winner
Clifton Ryan — Defensive Lineman, St. Louis Rams
Sam Sword (Class of 1994) — football player, Colts
Dar Tucker (Class of 2007) — basketball player, DePaul University
Curt Young (Class of 1978) — current pitching coach of the San Francisco Giants, and MLB player (Oakland Athletics, Kansas City Royals, New York Yankees)
Christopher Currell (Class of 1967) - touring member of Michael Jackson’s Bad Tour (1987–89); played synclavier on Michael Jackson's Bad album album (1987).

Notable staff alumni

George Ihler, football head coach of the undefeated and unscored upon 1973 football team.

References

External links 
 
 Saginaw Public School District

Educational institutions established in 1903
Public high schools in Michigan
Schools in Saginaw County, Michigan
1903 establishments in Michigan
Saginaw Intermediate School District